John Bulmer (born 28 February 1938) is a photographer, notable for his early use of colour in photojournalism, and a filmmaker.

Life and career
Bulmer was born on 28 February 1938 in Herefordshire, the grandson of the founder of the Bulmer cider company. He started photography when young. Although his earliest interest in it was primarily as a technology (he even built his own enlarger), he was a great admirer of Henri Cartier-Bresson as a teenager.

Bulmer studied engineering at Cambridge, where his interest in photography deepened. While still a student he had photographs published in Varsity as well as a magazine he co-founded, Image; and did photostories for the Daily Express, Queen, and (on night climbing) Life. He also worked as an assistant to Larry Burrows and Burt Glinn. The Life story led to his expulsion from Cambridge six weeks before his finals.

On his expulsion, Bulmer attempted to get a job with the Daily Express; after three days of repeated attempts, the newspaper gave him one. He stayed for two years. After this he worked on assignments for a number of magazines: first in black and white, for Queen, Town, and Time and Tide. His ambition then was photography as journalism:

I wasn't interested in art photography, I was interested in photography as journalism, the last thing I wanted to do was put my photographs on the walls of galleries; I wanted them in magazines.

Thanks in part to a wave of creative people from the north of England, the north was at the time enjoying a vogue in the south. Bulmer's first assignment there was in 1960, for Town, to spend three days photographing the fast-declining Lancashire town of Nelson and compare it with the fast-growing Watford. He found the experience eye-opening and enjoyable.

By this time, Bulmer had evolved his own style:

intimate close shots of people on the streets and public places done with a wide-angle lens interspersed with compressed views of architecture, industry and townscape with a longer lens. The long lens was also used to isolate a figure on the streets.Bulmer liked to work with a 35 mm camera, and his favourite combination of focal lengths was a 28 or a 35 mm lens, plus either a 105 or a 180 mm lens. Bulmer as quoted in Hamilton, "Northern exposures".

In addition to Cartier-Bresson, Bulmer admired the work in black and white of Bill Brandt, Larry Burrows, William Klein, Mark Kauffman, and particularly Eugene Smith; but he was asked to work in colour for the Sunday Times Colour Section from its launch in 1962. At the time, most photojournalists looked down on colour photography as commercial; and colour film was difficult to work with as it was slower than black and white and had less exposure latitude.

In 1965, Bulmer first photographed the north of England in colour, for the Sunday Times magazine. Colour photography was "a medium in which Bulmer was the British pioneer", far ahead of such photographers as William Eggleston and Martin Parr. Using colour for the north of England was Bulmer's idea, as was the choice of winter or wet weather, when colour film was yet harder to use.

Grant Scott has described the results:

Saturated but muted colours combined with [Bulmer's] compositional talent to create images which are time capsules as contemporary today as they were then.

The priorities of the Sunday Times Magazine changed in the 1970s; its then-new editor Hunter Davies explained them to Bulmer as "crime, middle-class living and fashion". These were of little interest to Bulmer, who left in 1973 after a final story about North Korea. However, he continued photography for other publications, making his last story of the north of England in 1976, for the British edition of Geo.

Bulmer later photographed celebrities.

The editor of Town, David Hughes, introduced Bulmer to his wife, Mai Zetterling, with whom he then occasionally worked as cinematographer. For some time, Bulmer combined photography with work in film, which was refreshingly different and also promised an escape from the increasingly limited interests of the news magazines. His start in television documentary film came suddenly. When he managed to obtain a visa for Burma, the Sunday Times was uninterested in any story there, and so he

went to the BBC and said, "I've never shot a film in my life before, but I've got this visa, will you give me some money?" And they said yes and that's how I came to make my first film.

As well as the BBC, Bulmer also filmed for the Discovery Channel. For the latter, "Bulmer focused on little-known tribal groups, but treated them as human interest stories rather than exercises in the exotic": a perspective that can also be seen in his early photography.

As Bulmer moved away from photography to film, his earlier photographic work was overlooked. Martin Harrison credits a 1983 exhibition at the Photographers' Gallery, British Photography 1955–65: The Master Craftsmen in Print (curated by Sue Davies), with saving the work of Bulmer (as well as Graham Finlayson and others) from obscurity. Most of a 17-page "Colour Section" within Harrison's own 1998 book Young Meteors: British Photojournalism, 1957–1965 is devoted to Bulmer and his colour work of the north of England.

Bulmer's career in film continued to the mid-2000s, when he retired and turned to digitising and cataloguing his earlier photographs.

Bulmer is married to the sculptor Angela Conner. The couple live at Monnington on Wye in a house, Monnington Court, that Bulmer bought in the 1960s and where they breed and train Morgan horses.

Films and videos photographed, directed, or produced
Dir, directed; pho, photographed; pro, produced.

The Artist's Horse. 20 minutes, for The South Bank Show, 1978. Dir, pho, pro
Beehives and Runaway Wives. For the Discovery Channel, 2002. Dir, pho
Bull Magic. For Under the Sun (BBC) and National Geographic, 1994. Dir, pho, pro
Dances with Llamas. 50 minutes, for Under the Sun (BBC), 1997. Dir, pho, pro
Empty Quarter. 50 minutes, for Journeys (BBC), 1996. Dir, pho
Fat Fiancees. For the Discovery Channel, 2005. Dir, pho
Finite Oceans. 1995.
House of the Spirits. For the Discovery Channel. Dir, pho
How Does It Feel?. Pictures that Move, 1976. Pho
Månen är en grön ost. 72 minutes, Stiftelsen Svenska Filminstitutet, 1977. Pho
Mud and Water Man. For the BBC, 1973. Pho
A Mysterious Death. 49 minutes, for the BBC, 1999. Dir, pho
Now Is the Hour. 1970. Dir
The Painter and the Fighter. For Survival (Anglia), 1996. Dir, pho
Queen of the Elephants. 90 minutes, for the Discovery Channel, 1994. Pho
The Search for Shangri-La. 50 minutes, for the BBC and PBS. Dir, pho
Stick Fights and Lip Plates. 50 minutes, for the Discovery Channel. Dir, pho
Sunday Pursuit (or Love at First Sight). 25 minutes, 1990. Pho
The Tide of War. 50 minutes, for National Geographic, 1991. Pho
Up North. 1970. Dir
Vincent the Dutchman. 50/52/60 minutes, for Omnibus, 1972. (Winner of a BAFTA award for "Television: Specialised Programme" in 1973.)
The Witchdoctor's New Bride. 50 minutes, for the Discovery Channel, 2005. Dir, pho
Women of the Yellow Earth. 50 minutes, 1994. Dir, pho

Exhibitions

Solo exhibitions
"Hard Sixties: L'Angleterre post-industrielle / Post-Industrial Britain". Galerie David Guirand (Paris), October–December 2008.
"John Bulmer Retrospective". Hereford Museum and Art Gallery, May–June 2009. Then touring: "John Bulmer, a Retrospective: Photographs from 1959–1979", Lucy Bell Gallery (St Leonards-on-Sea, East Sussex), June–July 2010.
"Northern Soul". National Coal Mining Museum for England (Overton, West Yorkshire), January–April 2010. Touring: West Gallery, Woodhorn Museum (Ashington, Northumberland), December 2010 – March 2011. Leeds College of Art, Leeds, April–May 2012. Locomotion (National Railway Museum, Shildon, County Durham), September–November 2012. Museum of Cannock Chase (Hednesford, Staffordshire), January–March 2013.
"John Bulmer: A Retrospective, Photographs from 1959–79". Hotshoe Gallery (London), April–May 2010.
"The North". Third Floor Gallery (Cardiff), May–June 2011.
"Out of England: Images from Overseas". Art360 Gallery (Hereford), October–November 2011.
"Orkney in Colour", Pier Arts Centre (Stromness), June–July 2011.
"Britain's Hard 60s: John Bulmer's Colour Photographs of a Changing Britain". Monnow Valley Arts (Walterstone, Herefordshire). April–June 2012.

Group exhibitions
"British Photography 1955–65: The Master Craftsmen in Print", Photographers' Gallery (London), 1983.
"The Young Meteors: British Photojournalism 1957–1965." National Museum of Photography, Film and Television (Bradford), July–November 1998; Focus Gallery (London), 1999.
"Saturday Night and Sunday Morning: The Authentic Moment in British Photography", Djanogly Art Gallery, Lakeside Arts Centre, University of Nottingham, November 2012 – February 2013.

Books

Books devoted to Bulmer's photographs
Northern Soul: John Bulmer's Images of Life and Times in the 1960s. Overton: National Coal Mining Museum for England, 2010. National Coal Mining Museum for England publications, 10. . The catalogue for an exhibition at the National Coal Mining Museum for England.
The North. Liverpool: Bluecoat Press, 2012. .
Wind of Change. Liverpool: Bluecoat Press, 2014. .
A Very English Village. Liverpool: Bluecoat Press, 2021. With text by Martin Page. .

Zines devoted to Bulmer's photographs
Hartlepool 1960s. Southport: Café Royal, 2017. Edition of 200 copies. Second edition, 2020.
Manchester 1970s. Southport: Café Royal, 2017. Edition of 200 copies. Second edition, 2020.

Other books with Bulmer's photographs
The White Tribes of Africa. London: Cape, 1965. New York: Macmillan, 1965. Photographs by Bulmer, text by Richard West.
The Gringo in Latin America. London: Cape, 1967. Photographs by Bulmer, text by Richard West.
Martin Harrison. Young Meteors: British Photojournalism, 1957–1965. London: Jonathan Cape, 1998. . The catalogue for an exhibition at the National Museum of Photography, Film and Television (Bradford). Pp. 80–93 are devoted to Bulmer.

Notes

References

External links
John Bulmer's website
Carey Gough, "Part one of two: John Bulmer interview", Hereford Photography Festival blog, 9 May 2009.
Carey Gough, "John Bulmer interview part 2", Hereford Photography Festival blog, 19 May 2009.
"John Bulmer Retrospective (video), Vimeo.
"Miners, mothers and mill girls: capturing the changing North" (selection of photographs). The Telegraph.
"John Bulmer: photographs from the north of England to South America" (selection of photographs). The Guardian, 29 May 2009.
Martin Wainwright, "North faces: John Bulmer's photographs of life in northern England" (selection of photographs). The Guardian, 2 February 2010.
Sophie Haydock, "My pony was that good, I’d give him my lunch – he was earning the money". The Guardian, 8 September 2017. "That's me in the picture": "Joseph McQuiggan recalls life as a miner at Nettlesworth Colliery, County Durham in 1965", where Bulmer photographed him.
Audio Interview on Ffoton Wales, October 2017

English photojournalists
People from Herefordshire
The Sunday Times photojournalists
Daily Express photojournalists
English documentary filmmakers
English cinematographers
English television directors
Living people
1938 births